TCG Atılay was a submarine of the Turkish Navy, which sank on 14 July 1942. Its wreck was located after more than 50 years.

She was built at Germaniawerft, Kiel, being launched in 1938. Her name was chosen as Atılay personally by a written decree of the founder of the modern Turkey President Mustafa Kemal Atatürk (1881–1938). Her sister submarines were named Saldıray, Batıray and Yıldıray. She was commissioned on 19 May 1939.

Sinking
On 14 July 1942, Atılay was tasked by the Fleet Command to conduct testing on underwater magnetic security lines in the Dardanelles Strait. Carrying 38 crew, she was commanded by LCdr Sadi Gürcan.

The vessel came to Çanakkale and moored around 7:30 hours local time. After a briefing held between 8:00 and 9:00, she dived in Morto Bay at 14:30 to leave the Strait, accompanied by a security boat on the surface. However, due to bad weather conditions, the escort boat soon lost its contact with the submarine. As the submarine did not return in due time, two navy boats were sent for search and rescue operation. At 20:30, the submarine's rescue buoy was found. The emergency station of the navy was, however, unable to establish a telephone contact with the submarine although the telephone in the rescue buoy was intact. A seaman named Ahmet Bağdat, who had disembarked for crew rations, was the only one to survive the disaster. The fate of the submarine remained unknown for years.

Aftermath 
In 1994 after more than 50 years, Selçuk Kolay, with the support of the "Rahmi M. Koç Foundation for Museum Studies and Culture", found in a two-and-half-month research the exact location of the wreck of Atılay. A  hole in the hull proved that she hit a naval mine. It is assumed that the mine was a World War I munition, which was laid during the Dardanelles Campaign.

A crew member, Warrant officer Fethi Yüceses, was the husband of Hamiyet Yüceses, a well-known Turkish singer. After the 14 July event, she released a song Gitti de Gelmeyiverdi ("He Went and Didn't Return"), which became a popular song of the time.

Museum project
In the general congress of Chambers of Shipping a project was proposed by the architect Kaya Şener. According to this project the submarine will be relocated in 30 meters depth  and a museum will be established in the submarine. So far the project is not realised.

Citations

References 

Ships built in Istanbul
1938 ships
Ay-class submarines
Maritime incidents in Turkey
1942 in Turkey
Maritime incidents in July 1942
Shipwrecks in the Dardanelles
Çanakkale Province
Ships sunk by mines